Pecka (feminine Pecková) is a Czech surname meaning "kernel" (of a fruit). Notable people include:
 Dagmar Pecková, Czech opera singer
 Jan Pecka, Czech canoeist
 Jiří Pecka, Czech canoeist
 Jiří Pecka (cyclist), Czech cyclist
 Josef Boleslav Pecka, Czech journalist and politician
 Luboš Pecka, Czech footballer
 Tereza Pecková, Czech basketball player
 Zdeněk Pecka, Czech rower

See also 
 Asteroid 18460 Pecková, named after Dagmar Pecková

Czech-language surnames